Veron Načinović (born 7 March 2000) is a Croatian handball player who plays for Montpellier Handball.

He is the son of former handball player Alvaro Načinović.

References

External links
National team stats
Premijer liga stats
EHF profile

Croatian male handball players
RK Zamet players
Handball players from Rijeka
2000 births
Living people
Montpellier Handball players
21st-century Croatian people